Thryptomene mucronulata is a species of flowering plant in the family Myrtaceae and is endemic to Western Australia. It is an erect shrub with upward-pointing, overlapping, egg-shaped leaves with the narrower end towards the base and pink flowers with five petals and ten stamens.

Description
The leaves have prominent oil glands and sometimes toothed edges.

Taxonomy
Thryptomene mucronulata was first formally described in 1847 by Nikolai Turczaninow in Bulletin de la Société Impériale des Naturalistes de Moscou from specimens collected by James Drummond. The specific epithet (mucronulata) means "having a short, sharp point".

Distribution and habitat
This thryptomene grows among rock outcrops and in winter-wet places near swamps and watercourses between Mullewa, Gingin and Wyalkatchem in the Avon Wheatbelt, Geraldton Sandplains, Jarrah Forest and Swan Coastal Plain biogeographic regions of south-western Western Australia.

Conservation status
Thryptomene mucronulata is classified as "not threatened" by the Western Australian Government Department of Parks and Wildlife.

References

mucronulata
Rosids of Western Australia
Plants described in 1847
Taxa named by Nikolai Turczaninow